Tintorettor Jishu may refer to:

 Tintorettor Jishu (novel), a 1982 novel by Satyajit Ray
 Tintorettor Jishu (film), a 2008 film directed by Sandip Ray, based on the novel